The Green River or Groen River is a river in the Northern Cape province of South Africa. It originates in the Kamiesberge range and has a catchment area of about 4500 km2. The river mouth is located about 120 km NNW of Strandfontein in the Namaqua National Park area by the Green River Mouth Lighthouse.

There is diamond exploration in the Green River Valley.

See also 
 List of rivers of South Africa

References

External links
Garies
West Coast - Namaqua National Park
Groen River estuary

Rivers of the Northern Cape